Dinara Yuldasheva (born 11 January 1952 in Tashkent) is an Uzbek playwright and theatre director.

She was born in 1952 into a creative family. Her grandmother Nazira Aliyeva was a drama teacher at the Theatrical Institute, who was awarded the People's Artist of Uzbekistan. Yuldasheva graduated with a degree in theatre criticism from the Tashkent Theatre and Art Institute in 1974. From 1983 to 1988 she studied at the Tashkent State Pedagogical Institute, specializing in primary education. From 1976 to 1986, she was in charge of the literary department in the Russian Youth Theater.

In 1991 she moved to the Republican Puppet Theatre, and after years of directing the literary department, in 2008 she was appointed director of the theatre.

References

Uzbekistani dramatists and playwrights
Women dramatists and playwrights
Uzbekistani theatre directors
Soviet dramatists and playwrights
1952 births
Living people
Writers from Tashkent
20th-century Uzbekistani writers
21st-century Uzbekistani writers
20th-century women writers
21st-century women writers
Soviet women writers